The Sydney Shield is a rugby league football competition played in Sydney, New South Wales. The competition is administered by the New South Wales Rugby League.

Clubs
Seven teams are competing in the 2022 Sydney Shield. The season commenced on March 19, 2022. The last round is scheduled for August 6, 2022, with a final series to follow.

The fixtures draw is available on the Play Rugby League website.

Sydney Shield Premiers

Premiership Tally 

Bold means the team still currently plays in the competition.

Timeline
The timeline below displays club participation in the Sydney Shield competition. Finals Series have been: Top 5 (2013), Top 8 (2014-19) and Top 4 (2020). The competition was cancelled in 2021 prior to the scheduled final series.

Previous Season Notes

2021
Eleven teams competed in the 2021 Sydney Shield. The season commenced on March 14, 2021. The last round was scheduled for August 22, 2021, with a final series to follow. The season was, however, suspended due to lockdown measures taken to combat the spread of the delta variant of the COVID-19 pandemic in New South Wales.

The eleven teams were:  Belrose Eagles (2013-21),  Cabramatta Two Blues (2020-21),  Cronulla-Caringbah Sharks (2020-21),  East Campbelltown Eagles (2014-21),  Hills District Bulls (2013-21),  Moorebank Rams,  Penrith Brothers,  Ryde-Eastwood Hawks,  St Marys Saints,  Wentworthville Magpies, and  Windsor Wolves (2015-16, 2020-21)

2020
Due to the COVID-19 pandemic in Australia the Sydney Shield competition was postponed after the first round on March 14 & 15. The competition was subsequently reconfigured. Nominations from the following clubs were accepted. Results from the matches in March were disregarded as the competition restarted on July 18. 

The teams that contested the revised competition were:  Belrose Eagles,  Cronulla-Caringbah Sharks (Premiers),  East Campbelltown Eagles,  Helensburgh Tigers,  Hills District Bulls,  Moorebank Rams,   Ryde-Eastwood Hawks,  Sydney University and   Wentworthville Magpies. 

Cronulla-Caringbah and Helensburgh were not in the first version of the 2020 Sydney Shield. The following teams had competed in the single, first round in March.  
 Asquith Magpies (lost 16-20)
 Blacktown Workers Sea Eagles (won 24-10)
 Cabramatta Two Blues (lost 16-28)
 Penrith Brothers (lost 6-59)
 St Marys Saints (won 20-16)
 Windsor Wolves (lost 10-24)

2019
In 2019, twelve clubs fielded teams in the Sydney Shield:

 East Campbelltown Eagles
 St Marys Saints
 Moorebank Rams
 Wentworthville Magpies
 Asquith Magpies
 Cabramatta Two Blues
 Guildford Owls
 Blacktown Workers Sea Eagles
 Belrose Eagles
 Hills District Bulls
 Penrith Brothers
 Sydney University

2017
Three clubs that competed in the 2016 season did not enter teams in 2017: The Auburn Warriors, Peninsula Seagulls and Windsor Wolves. For the first time, the Moorebank Rams Rugby League club entered a team in the Sydney Shield.  In 2018, Brothers Penrith were introduced into the Sydney Shield competition.  In 2019, former New South Wales Rugby League premiership side University entered the Sydney Shield.

The competition began on the weekend on March 4 & 5, 2017. The regular season concluded with Round 25 on the weekend of August 25, 26 & 27 (Friday to Sunday). A four-week finals series followed in September 2017.

See also

 Canterbury Cup NSW
 Ron Massey Cup
 President Cup
 NSW Challenge Cup
Rugby League Competitions in Australia

References

External links 

 
Rugby league competitions in New South Wales
Recurring sporting events established in 2012
2012 establishments in Australia
Sports leagues established in 2012
Rugby league in Sydney